Hemibungarus is a genus of venomous elapid snakes commonly known as barred coral snakes.

Distribution 
Hemibungarus species are  endemic to the Philippines.

Species 
Barred coral snake, Hemibungarus calligaster (Wiegmann, 1835)
Philippine false coral snake, Hemibungarus gemianulis (Peters, 1872)
McClung's Philippine coral snake, Hemibungarus mcclungi (Taylor, 1922)

References 

 
Taxa named by Wilhelm Peters